Transcription cofactor HES-6 is a protein that in humans is encoded by the HES6 gene.

Interactions 

HES6 has been shown to interact with TLE1.

References

Further reading

External links 
 

Transcription factors